Mandala Suci Wenara Wana, also known as Ubud Monkey Forest, is a sanctuary  located at Padangtegal Ubud, Bali, Indonesia

Monkeys 

About 1260 Balinese long-tailed macaque monkeys live in this sanctuary. They are divided into 10 groups, namely in front of main temple group, forest conservation group, central point group, eastern group, michelin group, ashram group, atap and cemeteries group. We also divide the monkeys by age: 63 adult male, 34 Sub-adult male, 219 Adult female, 29 Sub-adult female, 167 juveniles 1 (2-3 year), 118 juveniles 2 (1-2 year), 63 Infant old (5-12 month) and 56 infant.

Sacred Monkey Forest Ubud is a famous tourist attraction in Ubud. In every month around 10,000–15,000 visitors come to Monkey Forest Ubud. The Monkey Forest Ubud has 186 species of plants and trees in 12,5 hectares of forest. The Monkey Forest Ubud has 3 temples, namely Dalem Agung Padangtegal Temple, Holy Spring Temple and Prajapati Temple. The forest is owned by the Padangtegal community and is managed by Mandala Suci Wenara Wana Management.  The purpose of the management is to keep sacred the place and promote the Monkey Forest Ubud as an international tourist destination.

The Monkey Forest lies within the village of Padangtegal, which owns it. The village's residents view the Monkey Forest as an important spiritual, economic, educational, and conservation center for the village.

Mission
The Ubud Monkey Forest describes its mission as conservation of the area within its boundaries according to the Hindu principle of Tri Hata Karana ("Three ways to reach spiritual and physical well-being"), which seeks to make people live harmoniously during their lives. The "three ways" to this goal under the Tri Hata Karana doctrine are harmonious relationships between humans and humans, between humans and the natural environment, and between humans and The Supreme God. Accordingly, the Monkey Forest has a philosophical goal of creating peace and harmony for visitors from all over the world. It also seeks to conserve rare plants and animals for use in Hindu rituals and to provide a natural laboratory for educational institutions, with a particular emphasis on research into the social interaction of the park's monkeys with one another and their interaction with the park's natural environment.

Physical features and facilities
The Ubud Monkey Forest covers approximately 
and contains at least 115 different species of trees.
The park is heavily forested and has lots of hills, And a deep ravine runs through the park grounds, at the bottom there is a rocky stream. Trails allow visitors access to many parts of the park, including the ravine and stream.

The Monkey Forest grounds have a forest conservation area, a public hall and gallery, an open stage, a canteen, a first aid center, a police post, parking and toilet facilities, and a composting facility.

Temples

The Monkey Forest grounds are home to three Hindu temples, all apparently constructed around 1350:

 The Pura Dalem Agung Padangtegal ("Padangtegal Great Temple of Death"), also known as the Main Temple, lies in the southwestern part of the park. The temple is used for worshiping the god Hyang Widhi in personification of Shiva, the Recycler or Transformer.
The Pura Beji, or Beji Temple, in the northwestern part of the park, is used for the worship of Hyang Widhi in personification of the goddess Gangga. A "Holy Spring" bathing temple, it is a place of spiritual and physical cleansing and purification prior to religious ceremonies.
 The Pura Prajapati, or Prajapati Temple, located in the northeastern part of the park, is used to worship Hyang Widhi in personification of Prajapati. A cemetery adjacent to this temple receives the bodies of the deceased for temporary burial while they await a mass cremation ceremony, held once every five years.

The temples play an important role in the spiritual life of the local community, and the monkey and its mythology are important in the Balinese art tradition. The Monkey Forest area is sanctified by the local community, and some parts of it are not open to view by the public. Sacred areas of the temples are closed to everyone except those willing to pray and wear proper Balinese praying attire.

Animals

Monkeys
In 2011, approximately 605 crab-eating macaques (Macaca fascicularis) – 39 adult males, 38 male sub-adults, 194 adult females, 243 juveniles, and 91 infants – lived in the Ubud Monkey Forest;
they are known locally as the Balinese long-tailed monkey. The park staff feeds the monkeys sweet potato three times a day, providing them with their main source of food in the park. The monkeys also feed on papaya leaf, maize, cucumber, coconut, and other local fruit. Although bananas were once for sale in the park for tourists wishing to feed the monkeys, however due to the monkeys becoming too fat and aggressive tourists are now prohibited from this. Visitors are also prohibited from feeding them snacks such as peanuts, cookies, biscuits, and bread. 

There are five groups of monkeys in the park, each occupying different territories; one group inhabits the area in front of the Main Temple, another the park's Michelin area, a third the park's eastern area, and a fourth the park's central area, while the fifth group lives in the cremation and cemetery area. In recent years, the monkey population has become larger than an environment undisturbed  by humans could support; it continues to grow, with the population density in 2013 higher than ever. Conflicts between the groups are unavoidable; for example, groups must pass through one another's territory to reach the stream during the dry season, and increasing population pressures also are bringing the groups into more frequent contact. 

The monkeys rest at night and are most active during the day, which brings them into constant contact with humans visiting during the park's business hours. Visitors can observe their daily activities – mating, fighting, grooming, and caring for their young – at close range, and can even sit next to monkeys along the park's paths.

the monkeys have lost their fear of humans. Generally, they will not approach humans who they believe are not offering food, but they invariably approach human visitors in groups and grab any bags containing food that the humans have. They may also grab plastic bottles and bags not containing food, as well as reach into visitors' bags and trouser pockets in search of food, and will climb onto visitors to reach food being held in a visitor's hand, even if the food is held above a visitor's head. The visitor will notice the interesting phenomenon of numerous obese monkeys, a testament to the almost unbounded food supply the huge number of tourists entering the forest provide.

The park staff advises visitors never to pull back an offer of food to a monkey or to touch a monkey, as either action can prompt an aggressive response by the animal. Although they generally ignore humans who they believe do not have food, they sometimes mistake a human's actions as an offer of food or an attempt to hide food. If a human does not provide the food the monkeys demand or does not provide it quickly enough, the monkeys occasionally will bite the human.

Park personnel carry slingshots with which to intimidate aggressive monkeys and intervene quickly in confrontations between monkeys and humans. Given the monkeys' apparently increasing aggressiveness toward humans and the risk their bites pose to human health, Balinese politicians have called for a cull of crab-eating macaques in Bali. Authorities have not formally accepted these calls.

Timor rusa deer

The Ubud Monkey Forest contains a fenced enclosure for a small herd of Timor rusa (Rusa timorensis timorensis), a type of deer native to the island of Timor. Visitors can view the deer enclosure.

Management
The Ubud Monkey Forest is owned by the village of Padangtegal, and village members serve on the Monkey Forest's governing council. The Padangtegal Wenara Wana Foundation – "Wenara Wana" being Balinese for "Monkey Forest" – manages the Monkey Forest and serves to maintain its sacred integrity and to promote it as a destination for visitors.

Gallery

References

External links 

 
 Tourism resource about the monkey forest, nature reserve and hindu temple complex in Ubud, Bali, Indonesia
 A wild-long tailed macaque monkey has adopted an abandoned kitten at Ubud's Monkey Forest in Bali
 Photographs of Bali and Monkey Forest in Ubud by Jonathan Flaum
 Ubud Monkey Forest FAQs and safety advice
 Ultimate guide to behaving and making friends with the monkey in Ubud, Bali
 Precautions To Take While Visiting Ubud Monkey Forest, Bali

 Ubud Culture Tour

Parks in Indonesia
Ubud
Protected areas of Indonesia
Wildlife sanctuaries of Indonesia
Monkey parks
Geography of Bali
Tourist attractions in Bali